Niels Christian Frederiksen (Friderichsen) (23 March 1840 - 4 November 1905) was a Danish national economist, businessman and politician. He was a professor at the University of Copenhagen from 1867 and was a member of Folketinget from 1865. He emigrated to America after the collapse of his business conglomerate but returned to Denmark after a second bankruptcy. He was the brother of Erhard Frederiksen and Kirstine Frederiksen.

Early life and education
Frederiksen was born on 23 March 1840 at Fuglsang Manor on Lolland, the son of Hohannes D. Friderichsen (1791-1861) and Maria Hansen (1811-1901). He graduated from Sorø Academy in1857 and then enrolled at the University of Copenhagen where he studied political sciences (statsvidenskab). He won the university's gold medal in 1859 for a thesis on the influence of grain prices on wage levels. He graduated in 1862.

Academic career
Frederiksen competed for Julius Benzon-Buchwald's professorial chair in 1863. His competition piece, Er den frie Konkurrence under alle Omstændigheder i Almenvellets Interesse? (Is Free Competition Under All Circumstances in the Public Interest?"), a book of 156 pages, was written and printed in four weeks. He did not win the competition but was associated the university as docent  when professor Carl Johan Henrik Kayser retired in 1865 and was two years later appointed as professor. His writings were influenced by Frédéric Bastiat.

Politics
Frederiksen was interested in politics from an early age. He wrote about politics and national economy for Fædrelandet, especially about agricultural reforms. He was an enthusiastic proponent of Scandinavism. He was often in opposition to National Liberal views. In 1865, he was elected for Folketinget in the Maribo constituency in competition with a candidate from the Society of the Friends of Peasants. He ran with a programme of rather radical political reforms but most likely won due to the local popularity of his father. He was at later elections alternately endorsed by Højre and Venstre. Grederiksen and several Venstre-leaning National Liberals such as M. Gad and C. V. Nyholm joined a group of successful farmers, forming the so-called Ventre Party (Mellempartiet), which created an unstable majority by alternately voting with the two dominant parties. The Centre Party and especially Frederiksen contributed both to the fall of the Cabinet of Friis in 1870 and the fall of C. E. Fenger as Minister of Financial Affairs in 1872. After that the Centre Party gradually lost influence until it was dissolved in 1876. After a while Frederiksen then joined Venstre.

Commercial activities

Frederiksen was also active as a businessman. He also began to purchase land in Sweden until owning around 6,000 hectares. With great enthusiasm, he cultivated the land, purchased livestock, planted forest and established workshops and saw mills. In Copenhagen, he obtained citizenship as merchant (grocererborgerskab) to be able to sell his products and established a successful trading house.

In 1874, Frederiksen established Kjøbenhavns Papkassefabrik. It was initially located in Farimagsgade but soon relocated to larger premises on H. C. Ørsteds Vej. He sold it in 1876.

In 1871, Frederiksen was a co-founder of Landmandsbanken. He was a board member but left it when it failed to implement his ideas. He then turned to Industribanken where he after a while ended up with DKK 2 million in loans. The economic backlash in 1875 left him in a difficult situation. The Lolland Sugar Factory which had been founded by his brothers was also hit hard. Frederiksen tried to solve the situation by founding another bank, Centralbanken, but remained himself one of its few customers. Industribanken raised concerns and discontinued all loans, resulting in the bankruptcy both of Frederiksen and his brothers.

Bankruptcy and later years
In 1877, Frederiksen left Rigsdagen, resigned as professor and went abroad and emigrated to America. He spent the first years in Chicago and Milwaukee where he established a Danish weekly magazine, Heimdal. He later established a new company which bought land in the West from railway companies and sold it off in lots to settlers. The business venture initially prospered, growing to a considerable size, but Frederiksen once again adopted a too risky strategy and he also failed to keep track of the many transactions. He was therefore hit by a second bankruptcy and many of his customers were hit by losses. In 1889 he returned to Europe, initially in London and Paris where he spent most of his time with literary work. He later returned to Copenhagen where he was both active as a businessman and writer. In 1901, he published ''Finland. Dets private og offentlige Økonomi'. He also wrote for a number of magazines.

Personal life
Frederiksen married Ada Maria Monrad (19 April 1841 - 2 December 1915 (a daughter of later bishop and government minister D. G. M. (1811–87) and Emilie N. Lütthans (1815–71)), on 1 May 1865 in Kongens Lyngby. Only one of their seven children, Ditlev Gothard Monrad Frederiksen (1866-1938) survived to adulthood.

References

External links

 Niels Christian Frederiksen at geni.com

Danish economists
19th-century Danish businesspeople
University of Copenhagen alumni
Academic staff of the University of Copenhagen
People from Lolland
1840 births
1905 deaths